Kawawachikamach may refer to two distinct and non-adjacent but conceptually connected places in Quebec:
 Kawawachikamach, Quebec, a Naskapi reserved land with a few hundred inhabitants
 Kawawachikamach (Naskapi village municipality), an uninhabited area with no resident population